Five-time defending champion Richard Sears defeated Robert Livingston Beeckman in the challenge round, 4–6, 6–1, 6–3, 6–4 to win the men's singles tennis title at the 1886 U.S. National Championships. For the first time, all matches were played as best of five sets.

Draw

Challenge round

Finals

Earlier rounds

Section 1

Section 2

Section 3

Section 4

References 
 

Men's singles
1887